Derek Gavin Parks (born September 29, 1968) is a former Major League Baseball catcher. He played parts of three seasons in the majors (–) for the Minnesota Twins and was scouted as "uncoachable."  His daughter, Ashley, has been married to MLB pitcher Joe Kelly since November 2013.

References

External links

1968 births
Major League Baseball catchers
Minnesota Twins players
Elizabethton Twins players
Kenosha Twins players
Orlando Twins players
Portland Beavers players
Orlando Sun Rays players
Baseball players from California
Living people